Uhha-Ziti was the last independent king of Arzawa, a Bronze Age kingdom of western Anatolia.

Uhha-Ziti had two recorded children, Piyama-Kurunta and Tapalazunauli, who were of fighting age as of 1322 BC.

The Hittite king Mursili II in his second campaign season, 1322 BC, attacked Attarimma, Hu[wa]rsanassa, and Suruda on Arzawa's border. Their leaders fled to Arzawa. When the king demanded their extradition, Uhha-Ziti defied him and called him a "child". He also managed to enlist Manapa-Tarhunta of the Seha River Land, but not Maskhuiluwa of Mira.

Mursili put down a Kaska rebellion, and invaded Arzawa. Uhha-Ziti at this time had made his base at Apasa. During Mursili's march, a meteorite struck Apasa and wounded Uhha-Ziti, as recorded in the Annals of Mursili II:

"The mighty Storm God, My Lord, showed his divinely righteous power and hurled a thunderbolt. All of my troops saw the thunderbolt. All the land of Arzawa saw the thunderbolt. The thunderbolt passed (us) and struck the land of Arzawa. It struck Uḫḫa-Ziti’s (capital) city Apaša. It settled in Uḫḫa-Ziti’s knees, and he became ill."

In his wounded state, Uhha-Ziti could no longer lead the charge; therefore, having allied with the King of Ahhiuwa (most probably Mycenaean Greece)—the first time the "Ahhiya" are recorded with a monarch- he ordered Piyama-Kurunta to take the field at Walma by the Astarpa river. Piyama-Kurunta lost the battle, and Uhha-Ziti and his sons fled to the nearby Ahhiuwa-controlled islands.

Uhha-Ziti died while Mursili was besieging the men of Attarimma, Hu[wa]rsanassa, and Suruda at Puranda.

References

External links
The Arzawa Page

Translations
Catalan

Kings of Arzawa
14th-century BC rulers